Jennifer Graylock is an American fashion and entertainment photographer. 

In 2017, she won the Timothy White Award for Photography at the Hollywood Beauty Awards. In addition to her commercial photography, she has exhibited fine art photography, and also creates art furniture. Her work has been published in Vogue, Glamour, Us Weekly, People, TV Guide and InStyle.

Education 
She has a Master of Business Administration and a Bachelor of Science in photography at Fairleigh Dickinson University and Montana State University.

Works in the media 
Jennifer Graylock award winner for the Hollywood Beauty Awards
Jennifer Graylock interview by The Fashion Spot Jennifer Graylock
Jennifer Graylock photographs Emma Stone
Jennifer Graylock photographs Rihanna for the Us Weekly
Jennifer Graylock photographs Karlie Kloss at the 2017 Met Gala for </ref>*Jennifer Graylock photographs Scarlett Johansson for The Washington Post

References

External links 
 
 

American photojournalists
Commercial photographers
Fashion photographers
Montana State University alumni
Place of birth missing (living people)
Year of birth missing (living people)
Living people
American women photographers
American women journalists
Fairleigh Dickinson University alumni
21st-century American women
Women photojournalists